The Southern Philippines Agri-Business and Marine and Aquatic School of Technology, formerly known as Malita Agri-Business and Marine and Aquatic School of Technology, is a public college in the Philippines.  It is mandated to provide higher technologies and vocational instruction and training in science, agricultural and industrial fields, as well as short term technical or vocational courses. It is also mandated to promote research, advance studies and progressive leadership in its areas of specialization.  Its Main (Malita) Campus is located in Brgy. Poblacion. It has one satellite campus located in Brgy. Buhangin still in Malita. In 2019, the Digos Campus was separated to form a new state college.

History
SPAMAST traces its roots from Malita Barangay High School when it was created through Municipal Ordinance No. 70 on 1966. On July 5, 1968 through Municipal Resolution No. 80, it became the “Malita High School" which offered a complete secondary curriculum. In 1969, a Marcos–type building with 10 rooms was constructed in a two-hectare lot donated by Mrs. Juanita De Salmon.

On February 8, 1982 through Batas Pambansa Bilang 148, the Malita High School was converted into a state college known as the “Malita Agri-Business and Marine and Aquatic School of Technology” (MAMAST). This was the realization of then Assemblyman Benjamin V. Bautista's dream of education. Engr. Ramon M. Barbon became the first College President.

On March 9, 1984, the Batas Pambansa Bilang 65 changed the name of MAMAST to “Southern Philippines Agri-Business, Marine and Aquatic School of Technology (SPAMAST)” to expand its scope and interest in the fields of agriculture and fisheries.

Since then, SPAMAST has flourished and acquired significant properties that are now sites for the realization of its mission and vision. In 1989, SPAMAST acquired an 8-hectare land in Buhangin, Malita which is now the College of Agricultural Sciences (CAS) Campus. In 1992, the Provincial Government of Davao del Sur donated a 5.4-hectare land in Brgy. Matti, Digos City for the establishment of the Digos Campus. In 1993, a 1.5-hectare land was acquired by the college along the shoreline fronting the Malita Campus.

In 2019, by virtue of Republic Act 11220 the Digos Campus was separated and converted to Davao del Sur State College.

Website(s)
 http://www.spamast.edu.ph

References
General
 http://www.students-account.spamast.net/index.php/list-of-students/bsed/3-level/56-history-of-the-institution
 http://www.chanrobles.com/bataspambansa/bataspambansablg651.html
 http://www.chanrobles.com/bataspambansa/bataspambansablg148.html
Specific

State universities and colleges in the Philippines
Universities and colleges in Davao Occidental
Universities and colleges in Davao del Sur
Educational institutions established in 1966